Mourad Benhamida (born 18 January 1986) is a French footballer who plays as defender for French lower league side Vaulx-en-Velin FC.

Career

Olympique Lyon
Born in Villeurbanne, Rhône, Benhamida was trained in the youth sections and player development program of Olympique Lyon.

He was known for his prowess in the ranks of the Olympique Lyon's junior amateur team, playing in the CFA 2 that he captained. In April 2006, Olympique Lyonnais' president Jean-Michel Aulas announced that Benhamida would sign a one-year professional contract with the club alongside fellow young hope and France U-18 international Grégory Bettiol. Both helped their team win the second division Amateur Championship to get promoted in the CFA.

He was considered part of the young generation of promising players formed by Olympique Lyonnais who were signed by the club (sometimes before being sold to other outfits) like: Jérémy Berthod, Karim Benzema, Hatem Ben Arfa, Bryan Bergougnoux, Grégory Bettiol, and Jérémy Clément.

Montpellier HSC
Benhamida, after receiving little playing time with Lyon, transferred to Montpellier HSC on a Bosman transfer. He made his debut as a late-match substitute in Montpellier's 3–1 win over FC Libourne. He scored his first goal on 17 August 2007 against Troyes AC in Montpellier's 3–0 victory.

Honours
 Champion de France des réserves: 2006
 Coupe Gambardella finalist: 2005
 Champion de France 18 ans: 2005

References

1986 births
Living people
People from Villeurbanne
Association football defenders
French footballers
Ligue 1 players
Olympique Lyonnais players
Montpellier HSC players
French sportspeople of Tunisian descent
Lyon La Duchère players
Club Africain players
Expatriate footballers in Tunisia
French expatriate sportspeople in Tunisia
FC Vaulx-en-Velin players
Sportspeople from Lyon Metropolis
Footballers from Auvergne-Rhône-Alpes